The 2013 San Diego Padres season was their 45th season in MLB, and their 9th at Petco Park.

The Padres started the season on April 1 against the New York Mets. The Padres matched their record from the previous year of 76-86.

Offseason and spring training
On January 30, 2013, 2012 Gold Glove and Silver Slugger third baseman Chase Headley signed a one-year contract worth $8.575 million with San Diego. On March 17, 2013, during spring training, he fractured the tip of his left thumb when it got caught under the second base bag while he was sliding feet-first to break up a double play. He started the season on the disabled list, and returned exactly a month after the injury on April 17.

The Padres finished in eleventh place at the end of spring training, eleven games behind first place Kansas City Royals, with a 16-20 record (10-9 home / 6-11 away) and .444 percentage in the Cactus League.

Regular season
The Padres began the season with a 5–15 record, but then went 30–19 to move a game above .500 (35–34) for the first time since ending the 2010 season at 90–72.

Rookie second baseman Jedd Gyorko finished the season as the team leader in both home runs (HR) (23) and runs batted in (RBI) (63). His HR total led all MLB rookies that season, and he was the first rookie second baseman in MLB history to lead his team in RBIs. Additionally, he became just the second rookie to lead the Padres in either category since Nate Colbert in San Diego's inaugural season in 1969.

Season standings

National League West

National League Wild Card

Game log 

|-  style="text-align:center; bgcolor="ffbbbb"
| 1 || April 1 || @ Mets || 2–11 || Niese (1–0) || Vólquez (0–1) ||  || 41,053 || 0–1 || Box
|-  style="text-align:center; bgcolor="ffbbbb"
| 2 || April 3 || @ Mets || 4–8 || Harvey (1–0) || Richard (0–1) ||  || 22,239 || 0–2 || Box
|-  style="text-align:center; bgcolor="bbffbb"
| 3 || April 4 || @ Mets || 2–1 || Stults (1–0) || Gee (0–1) || Street (1) || 21,519 || 1–2 || Box
|-  style="text-align:center; bgcolor="ffbbbb"
| 4 || April 5 || @ Rockies || 2–5 || Francis (1–0) || Marquis (0–1) || Betancourt (2) || 49,077 || 1–3 || Box
|-  style="text-align:center; bgcolor="ffbbbb"
| 5 || April 6 || @ Rockies || 3–6 || Garland (1–0) || Ross (0–1) || Betancourt (3) || 31,133 || 1–4 || Box
|-  style="text-align:center; bgcolor="ffbbbb"
| 6 || April 7 || @ Rockies || 1–9 || Chacín (1–0) || Vólquez (0–2) ||  || 31,060 || 1–5 || Box
|-  style="text-align:center; bgcolor="bbffbb"
| 7 || April 9 || Dodgers || 9–3 || Gregerson (1–0) || Belisario (0–1) ||  || 44,436 || 2–5 || Box
|-  style="text-align:center; bgcolor="ffbbbb"
| 8 || April 10 || Dodgers || 3–4 || Billingsley (1–0) || Stults (1–1) || League (3) || 22,843 || 2–6 || Box
|-  style="text-align:center; bgcolor="ffbbbb"
| 9 || April 11 || Dodgers || 2–3 || Guerrier (1–0) || Gregerson (1–1) || Jansen (1) || 24,610 || 2–7 || Box
|-  style="text-align:center; bgcolor="ffbbbb"
| 10 || April 12 || Rockies || 5–7 || Brothers (1–0) || Street (0–1) || Betancourt (4) || 21,814 || 2–8 || Box
|-  style="text-align:center; bgcolor="ffbbbb"
| 11 || April 13 || Rockies || 5–9 || Chacín (2–0) || Vólquez (0–3) ||  || 29,523 || 2–9 || Box
|-  style="text-align:center; bgcolor="ffbbbb"
| 12 || April 14 || Rockies || 1–2 || de la Rosa (1–1) || Thayer (0–1) || Betancourt (5) || 21,337 || 2–10 || Box
|-  style="text-align:center; bgcolor="bbffbb"
| 13 || April 15 || @ Dodgers || 6–3 || Stults (2–1) || Belisario (0–2) || Street (2) || 52,136 || 3–10 || Box
|-  style="text-align:center; bgcolor="bbffbb"
| 14 || April 16 || @ Dodgers || 9–2 || Marquis (1–1) || Capuano (0–1) ||  || 35,898 || 4–10 || Box
|-  style="text-align:center; bgcolor="bbffbb"
| 15 || April 17 || @ Dodgers || 7–2 || Brach (1–0) || Kershaw (2–2) ||  || 52,393 || 5–10 || Box
|-  style="text-align:center; bgcolor="ffbbbb"
| 16 || April 19 || @ Giants || 2–3 || Casilla (2–1) || Gregerson (1–2) ||  || 41,559 || 5–11 || Box
|-  style="text-align:center; bgcolor="ffbbbb"
| 17 || April 20 || @ Giants || 0–2 || Lincecum (2–0) || Cashner (0–1) || Romo (8) || 41,995 || 5–12 || Box
|-  style="text-align:center; bgcolor="ffbbbb"
| 18 || April 21 || @ Giants || 0–5 || Zito (3–1) || Stults (2–2) ||  || 42,747 || 5–13 || Box
|-  style="text-align:center; bgcolor="ffbbbb"
| 19 || April 22 || Brewers || 1–7 || Lohse (1–1) || Marquis (1–2) ||  || 18,643 || 5–14 || Box
|-  style="text-align:center; bgcolor="ffbbbb"
| 20 || April 23 || Brewers || 3–6 || Gallardo (2–1) || Richard (0–2) || Henderson (5) || 19,560 || 5–15 || Box
|-  style="text-align:center; bgcolor="bbffbb"
| 21 || April 24 || Brewers || 2–1 || Vólquez (1–3) || Estrada (2–1) || Street (3) || 17,205 || 6–15 || Box
|-  style="text-align:center; bgcolor="bbffbb"
| 22 || April 26 || Giants || 2–1 || Cashner (1–1) || Lincecum (2–1) || Street (4) || 34,929 || 7–15 || Box
|-  style="text-align:center; bgcolor="bbffbb"
| 23 || April 27 || Giants || 8–7 || Thatcher (1–0) || Romo (1–2) ||  || 38,823 || 8–15 || Box
|-  style="text-align:center; bgcolor="bbffbb"
| 24 || April 28 || Giants || 6–4 || Marquis (2–2) || Vogelsong (1–2) || Street (5) || 33,722 || 9–15 || Box
|-  style="text-align:center; bgcolor="ffbbbb"
| 25 || April 29 || @ Cubs || 3–5 || Bowden (1–1) || Richard (0–3) || Gregg (4) || 32,169 || 9–16 || Box
|-  style="text-align:center; bgcolor="bbffbb"
| 26 || April 30 || @ Cubs || 13–7 || Vólquez (2–3) || Jackson (0–4) ||  || 31,303 || 10–16 || Box
|-

|-  style="text-align:center; bgcolor="ffbbbb"
| 27 || May 1 || @ Cubs || 2–6 || Feldman (2–3) || Cashner (1–2) ||  || 34,832 || 10–17 || Box
|-  style="text-align:center; bgcolor="bbffbb"
| 28 || May 2 || @ Cubs || 4–2 || Thatcher (2–0) || Wood (2–2) || Street (6) || 32,865 || 11–17 || Box
|-  style="text-align:center; bgcolor="bbffbb"
| 29 || May 3 || Diamondbacks || 7–6 || Marquis (3–2) || Miley (2–1) || Street (7) || 31,223 || 12–17 || Box
|-  style="text-align:center; bgcolor="ffbbbb"
| 30 || May 4 || Diamondbacks || 1–8 || Corbin (4–0) || Richard (0–4) ||  || 31,336 || 12–18 || Box
|-  style="text-align:center; bgcolor="bbffbb"
| 31 || May 5 || Diamondbacks || 5–1 || Vólquez (3–3) || Kennedy (1–3) ||  || 29,101 || 13–18 || Box
|-  style="text-align:center; bgcolor="bbffbb"
| 32 || May 6 || Marlins || 5–0 || Cashner (2–2) || LeBlanc (0–5) ||  || 14,596 || 14–18 || Box
|-  style="text-align:center; bgcolor="bbffbb"
| 33 || May 7 || Marlins || 5–1 || Stults (3–2) || Sanabia (2–5) ||  || 16,263 || 15–18 || Box
|-  style="text-align:center; bgcolor="bbffbb"
| 34 || May 8 || Marlins || 1–0 || Marquis (4–2) || Nolasco (2–4) || Street (8) || 16,730 || 16–18 || Box
|-  style="text-align:center; bgcolor="ffbbb"
| 35 || May 10 || @ Rays || 3–6 || McGee (1–2) || Thayer (0–2) || Rodney (5) || 12,424 || 16–19 || Box
|-  style="text-align:center; bgcolor="ffbbb"
| 36 || May 11 || @ Rays || 7–8 || Ramos (1–0) || Street (0–2) ||  || 18,587 || 16–20 || Box
|-  style="text-align:center; bgcolor="ffbbb"
| 37 || May 12 || @ Rays || 2–4 || Hernández (2–4) || Stults (3–3) || Rodney (6) || 17,396 || 16–21 || Box
|-  style="text-align:center; bgcolor="bbffbb"
| 38 || May 14 || @ Orioles || 3–2 || Gregerson (2–2) || Johnson (1–3) || Street (9) || 19,096 || 17–21 || Box
|-  style="text-align:center; bgcolor="bbffbb"
| 39 || May 15 || @ Orioles || 8–4 || Marquis (5–2) || García (0–2) ||  || 32,418 || 18–21 || Box
|-  style="text-align:center; bgcolor="ffbbb"
| 40 || May 16 || Nationals || 2–6 || Strasburg (2–5) || Vólquez (3–4) ||  || 24,234 || 18–22 || Box
|-  style="text-align:center; bgcolor="ffbbb"
| 41 || May 17 || Nationals || 5–6 (10) || Soriano (1–1) || Street (0–3) || Storen (1) || 29,898 || 18–23 || Box
|-  style="text-align:center; bgcolor="bbffbb"
| 42 || May 18 || Nationals || 2–1 || Stults (4–3) || Zimmermann (7–2) || Street (10) || 33,646 || 19–23 || Box
|-  style="text-align:center; bgcolor="bbffbb"
| 43 || May 19 || Nationals || 13–4 || Cashner (3–2) || Haren (4–5) ||  || 27,080 || 20–23 || Box
|-  style="text-align:center; bgcolor="bbffbb"
| 44 || May 20 || Cardinals || 4–2 || Marquis (6–2) || Miller (5–3) || Street (11) || 18,763 || 21–23 || Box
|-  style="text-align:center; bgcolor="ffbbb"
| 45 || May 21 || Cardinals || 2–10 || Wainwright (6–3) || Vólquez (3–5) ||  || 18,702 || 21–24 || Box
|-  style="text-align:center; bgcolor="ffbbb"
| 46 || May 22 || Cardinals || 3–5 || Lyons (1–0) || Smith (0–1) ||  || 18,683 || 21–25 || Box
|-  style="text-align:center; bgcolor="ffbbb"
| 47 || May 24 || @ Diamondbacks || 2–5 || McCarthy (2–3) || Stults (4–4) || Bell (7) || 24,043 || 21–26 || Box
|-  style="text-align:center; bgcolor="bbffbb"
| 48 || May 25 || @ Diamondbacks || 10–4 || Cashner (4–2) || Miley (3–4) ||  || 26,628 || 22–26 || Box
|-  style="text-align:center; bgcolor="ffbbbb"
| 49 || May 26 || @ Diamondbacks || 5–6 || Corbin (8–0) || Layne (0–1) || Bell (8) || 27,639 || 22–27 || Box
|-  style="text-align:center; bgcolor="ffbbbb"
| 50 || May 27 || @ Mariners || 0–9 || Harang (2–5) || Richard (0–5) ||  || 18,942 || 22–28 || Box
|-  style="text-align:center; bgcolor="bbffbb"
| 51 || May 28 || @ Mariners || 6–1 || Vólquez (4–5) || Maurer (2–7) ||  || 11,911 || 23–28 || Box
|-  style="text-align:center; bgcolor="bbffbb"
| 52 || May 29 || Mariners || 3–2 (10)|| Gregerson (3–2) || Medina (1–1) ||  || 19,882 || 24–28 || Box
|-  style="text-align:center; bgcolor="ffbbbb"
| 53 || May 30 || Mariners || 1–7 || Hernández (6–4) || Cashner (4–3) ||  || 18,809 || 24–29 || Box
|-  style="text-align:center; bgcolor="bbffbb"
| 54 || May 31 || Blue Jays || 4–3 (17) || Richard (1–5) || Redmond (0–1) ||  || 24,219 || 25–29 || Box
|-

|-  style="text-align:center; bgcolor="bbffbb"
| 55 || June 1 || Blue Jays || 4–3 || Erlin (1–0) || Buehrle (2–4) || Gregerson (1) || 40,403 || 26–29 || Box
|-  style="text-align:center; bgcolor="ffbbbb"
| 56 || June 2 || Blue Jays || 4–7 (11) || Janssen (1–0) || Boxberger (0–1) || Loup (2) || 20,384 || 26–30 || Box
|-  style="text-align:center; bgcolor="ffbbbb"
| 57 || June 3 || @ Dodgers || 1–2 || Fife (1–0) || Stults (4–5) || League (12) || 37,055 || 26–31 || Box
|-  style="text-align:center; bgcolor="ffbbbb"
| 58 || June 4 || @ Dodgers || 7–9 || Howell (2–0) || Ross (0–2) || League (13) || 37,544 || 26–32 || Box
|-  style="text-align:center; bgcolor="bbffbb"
| 59 || June 5 || @ Dodgers || 6–2 || Marquis (7–2) || Kershaw (5–4) ||  || 40,040 || 27–32 || Box
|-  style="text-align:center; bgcolor="bbffbb"
| 60 || June 6 || @ Rockies || 6–5 || Gregerson (4–2) || Corpas (0–1) || Boxberger (1) || 29,840 || 28–32 || Box
|-  style="text-align:center; bgcolor="ffbbbb"
| 61 || June 7 || @ Rockies || 9–10 || Belisle (4–2) || Thatcher (2–1) ||  || 30,477 || 28–33 || Box
|-  style="text-align:center; bgcolor="bbffbb"
| 62 || June 8 || @ Rockies || 4–2 || Stults (5–5) || Francis (2–4) || Gregerson (2) || 34,590 || 29–33 || Box
|-  style="text-align:center; bgcolor="ffbbbb"
| 63 || June 9 || @ Rockies || 7–8 (10) || Brothers (2–0) || Ross (0–3) ||  || 33,668 || 29–34 || Box
|-  style="text-align:center; bgcolor="bbffbb"
| 64 || June 10 || Braves || 7–6 || Marquis (8–2) || Teherán (4–3) || Thayer (1) || 21,192 || 30–34 || Box
|-  style="text-align:center; bgcolor="bbffbb"
| 65 || June 11 || Braves || 3–2 || Cashner (5–3) || Hudson (4–6) || Gregerson (3) || 22,330 || 31–34 || Box
|-  style="text-align:center; bgcolor="bbffbb"
| 66 || June 12 || Braves || 5–3 || Vólquez (5–5) || Maholm (7–5) || Vincent (1) || 22,316 || 32–34 || Box 
|-  style="text-align:center; bgcolor="bbffbb"
| 67 || June 14 || Diamondbacks || 2–1 || Stults (6–5) || Cahill (3–8) ||  || 23,364 || 33–34 || Box
|-  style="text-align:center; bgcolor="bbffbb"
| 68 || June 15 || Diamondbacks || 6–4 || Marquis (9–2) || Miley (4–6) || Street (12) || 29,756 || 34–34 || Box
|-  style="text-align:center; bgcolor="bbffbb"
| 69 || June 16 || Diamondbacks || 4–1 || Richard (2–5) || Hernandez (2–4) || Street (13) || 27,943 || 35–34 || Box
|-  style="text-align:center; bgcolor="bbffbb"
| 70 || June 17 || @ Giants || 5–3 (13) || Vincent (1–0) || Mijares (0–1) || Street (14) || 41,981 || 36–34 || Box
|-  style="text-align:center; bgcolor="ffbbbb"
| 71 || June 18 || @ Giants || 4–5 || Machi (2–0) || Thayer (0–3) || Romo (17) || 41,884 || 36–35 || Box
|-  style="text-align:center; bgcolor="ffbbbb"
| 72 || June 19 || @ Giants || 2–4 || Bumgarner (7–4) || Gregerson (4–3) || Romo (18) || 41,866 || 36–36 || Box
|-  style="text-align:center; bgcolor="bbffbb"
| 73 || June 20 || Dodgers || 6–3 || Vincent (2–0) || Guerrier (2–3) ||  || 30,656 || 37–36 || Box
|-  style="text-align:center; bgcolor="bbffbb"
| 74 || June 21 || Dodgers || 5–2 || Stauffer (1–0) || Kershaw (5–5) || Street (15) || 31,855 || 38–36 || Box
|-  style="text-align:center; bgcolor="ffbbbb"
| 75 || June 22 || Dodgers || 1–6 || Greinke (4–2) || Vólquez (5–6) ||  || 43,267 || 38–37 || Box
|-  style="text-align:center; bgcolor="ffbbbb"
| 76 || June 23 || Dodgers || 1–3 || League (3–3) || Street (0–4) || Jansen (4) || 31,098 || 38–38 || Box
|-  style="text-align:center; bgcolor="bbffbb"
| 77 || June 24 || Phillies || 4–3 (10) || Thatcher (3–1) || De Fratus (2–1) ||  || 26,265 || 39–38 || Box
|-  style="text-align:center; bgcolor="ffbbbb"
| 78 || June 25 || Phillies || 2–6 || Kendrick (7–4) || Marquis (9–3) ||  || 24,695 || 39–39 || Box
|-  style="text-align:center; bgcolor="ffbbbb"
| 79 || June 26 || Phillies || 5–7 (13) || Savery (1–0) || Layne (0–2) || Papelbon (15) || 25,610 || 39–40 || Box
|-  style="text-align:center; bgcolor="bbffbb"
| 80 || June 28 || @ Marlins || 9–2 || Vólquez (6–6) || Nolasco (4–8) ||  || 18,347 || 40–40 || Box
|-  style="text-align:center; bgcolor="ffbbbb"
| 81 || June 29 || @ Marlins || 1–7 || Turner (2–0) || Stults (6–6) ||  || 19,266 || 40–41 || Box
|-  style="text-align:center; bgcolor="ffbbbb"
| 82 || June 30 || @ Marlins || 2–6 || Cishek (2–4) || Ross (0–4) ||  || 15,929 || 40–42 || Box
|-

|-  style="text-align:center; bgcolor="ffbbbb"
| 83 || July 1 || @ Marlins || 0–4 || Fernández (5–4) || Marquis (9–4) || Cishek (15) || 14,669 || 40–43 || Box
|-  style="text-align:center; bgcolor="ffbbbb"
| 84 || July 2 || @ Red Sox || 1–4 || Lackey (6–5) || Erlin (1–1) || Uehara (5) || 36,498 || 40–44 || Box
|-  style="text-align:center; bgcolor="ffbbbb"
| 85 || July 3 || @ Red Sox || 1–2 || Uehara (2–0) || Gregerson (4–4) ||  || 36,911 || 40–45 || Box
|-  style="text-align:center; bgcolor="ffbbbb"
| 86 || July 4 || @ Red Sox || 2–8 || Webster (1–2) || Stults (6–7) ||  || 37,607 || 40–46 || Box
|-  style="text-align:center; bgcolor="ffbbbb"
| 87 || July 5 || @ Nationals || 5–8 || Gonzalez (6–3) || Cashner (5–4) || Soriano (23) || 33,979 || 40–47 || Box
|-  style="text-align:center; bgcolor="ffbbbb"
| 88 || July 6 || @ Nationals || 4–5 || Ohlendorf (2–0) || Vincent (2–1) || Soriano (24) || 33,314 || 40–48 || Box
|-  style="text-align:center; bgcolor="ffbbbb"
| 89 || July 7 || @ Nationals || 7–11 || Strasburg (5–6) || Erlin (1–2) ||  || 31,483 || 40–49 || Box
|-  style="text-align:center; bgcolor="ffbbbb"
| 90 || July 8 || Rockies || 2–4 || Chatwood (5–2) || Vólquez (6–7) || Betancourt (12) || 20,400 || 40–50 || Box
|-  style="text-align:center; bgcolor="bbffbb"
| 91 || July 9 || Rockies || 2–1 || Stults (7–7) || Chacín (8–4) ||  || 22,733 || 41–50 || Box
|-  style="text-align:center; bgcolor="ffbbbb"
| 92 || July 10 || Rockies || 4–5 || de la Rosa (9–5) || Cashner (5–5) || Betancourt (13) || 19,411 || 41–51 || Box
|-  style="text-align:center; bgcolor="ffbbbb"
| 93 || July 11 || Giants || 2–4 || Bumgarner (10–5) || Gregerson (4–5) || Romo (21) || 31,976 || 41–52 || Box
|-  style="text-align:center; bgcolor="ffbbbb"
| 94 || July 12 || Giants || 1–10 || Gaudin (3–1) || O'Sullivan (0–1) ||  || 42,361 || 41–53 || Box
|-  style="text-align:center; bgcolor="ffbbbb"
| 95 || July 13 || Giants || 0–9 || Lincecum (5–9) || Vólquez (6–8) ||  || 40,342 || 41–54 || Box
|-  style="text-align:center; bgcolor="bbffbb"
| 96 || July 14 || Giants || 10–1 || Stults (8–7) || Zito (4–7) ||  || 33,243 || 42–54 || Box
|- style="background:#bbcaff;"
| – || July 16 ||colspan="8" |2013 Major League Baseball All-Star Game at Citi Field in Queens, New York
|- style="background:"
|-  style="text-align:center; bgcolor="ffbbbb"
| 97 || July 19 || @ Cardinals || 6–9 || Westbrook (6–4) || Marquis (9–5) || Mujica (27) || 43,929 || 42–55 || Box
|-  style="text-align:center; bgcolor="bbffbb"
| 98 || July 20 || @ Cardinals || 5–3 || Vólquez (7–8) || Lynn (11–5) || Street (16) || 45,288 || 43–55 || Box
|-  style="text-align:center; bgcolor="ffbbbb"
| 99 || July 21 || @ Cardinals || 2–3 || Wainwright (13–5) || Stults (8–8) || Mujica (28) || 44,033 || 43–56 || Box
|-  style="text-align:center; bgcolor="bbffbb"
| 100 || July 22 || @ Brewers || 5–3 || Cashner (6–5) || Gorzelanny (1–4) || Street (17) || 30,348 || 44–56 || Box
|-  style="text-align:center; bgcolor="bbffbb"
| 101 || July 23 || @ Brewers || 6–2 || Ross (1–4) || Hand (0–2) ||  || 28,242 || 45–56 || Box
|-  style="text-align:center; bgcolor="ffbbbb"
| 102 || July 24 || @ Brewers || 1–3 || Lohse (7–7) || O'Sullivan (0–2) || Henderson (11) || 25,551 || 45–57 || Box
|-  style="text-align:center; bgcolor="bbffbb"
| 103 || July 25 || @ Brewers || 10–8 || Vólquez (8–8) || Gallardo (8–9) || Street (18) || 34,372 || 46–57 || Box
|-  style="text-align:center; bgcolor="ffbbbb"
| 104 || July 26 || @ Diamondbacks || 0–10 || Delgado (3–3) || Stults (8–9) ||  || 22,279 || 46–58 || Box
|-  style="text-align:center; bgcolor="bbffbb"
| 105 || July 27 || @ Diamondbacks || 12–3 || Cashner (7–5) || Skaggs (2–3) ||  || 30,033 || 47–58 || Box
|-  style="text-align:center; bgcolor="bbffbb"
| 106 || July 28 || @ Diamondbacks || 1–0 || Ross (2–4) || Corbin (12–2) || Street (19) || 24,864 || 48–58 || Box
|-  style="text-align:center; bgcolor="bbffbb"
| 107 || July 29 || Reds || 2–1 || Gregerson (5–5) || Chapman (3–4) ||  || 24,050 || 49–58 || Box
|-  style="text-align:center; bgcolor="bbffbb"
| 108 || July 30 || Reds || 4–2 || Thayer (1–3) || Parra (1–2) || Street (20) || 29,207 || 50–58 || Box
|-  style="text-align:center; bgcolor="ffbbbb"
| 109 || July 31 || Reds || 1–4 || Bailey (6–10) || Stults (8–10) || Chapman (25) || 26,450 || 50–59 || Box
|-

|-  style="text-align:center; bgcolor="bbffbb"
| 110 || August 2 || Yankees || 7–2 || Cashner (8–5) || Sabathia (9–10) ||  || 44,124 || 51–59 || Box
|-  style="text-align:center; bgcolor="ffbbbb"
| 111 || August 3 || Yankees || 0–3 || Nova (5–4) || Ross (2–5) || Rivera (35) || 44,184 || 51–60 || Box
|-  style="text-align:center; bgcolor="bbffbb"
| 112 || August 4 || Yankees || 6–3 || Kennedy (4–8) || Hughes (4–10) || Street (21) || 43,504 || 52–60 || Box
|-  style="text-align:center; bgcolor="ffbbbb"
| 113 || August 6 || Orioles || 1–4 || Norris (8–9) || Vólquez (8–9) || Johnson (39) || 29,415 || 52–61 || Box
|-  style="text-align:center; bgcolor="ffbbbb"
| 114 || August 7 || Orioles || 3–10 || Rodríguez (2–1) || Gregerson (5–6) ||  || 21,206 || 52–62 || Box
|-  style="text-align:center; bgcolor="ffbbbb"
| 115 || August 9 || @ Reds || 2–7 || Arroyo (10–9) || Cashner (8–6) ||  || 30,288 || 52–63 || Box
|-  style="text-align:center; bgcolor="bbffbb"
| 116 || August 10 || @ Reds || 3–1 || Ross (3–5) || Cingrani (5–2) || Street (22) || 34,777 || 53–63 || Box
|-  style="text-align:center; bgcolor="ffbbbb"
| 117 || August 11 || @ Reds || 2–3 (13) || LeCure (2–1) || Stauffer (1–1) ||  || 38,567 || 53–64 || Box
|-  style="text-align:center; bgcolor="ffbbbb"
| 118 || August 12 || @ Rockies || 2–14 || Chacín (11–6) || Vólquez (8–10) ||  || 30,986 || 53–65 || Box
|-  style="text-align:center; bgcolor="bbffbb"
| 119 || August 13 || @ Rockies || 7–5 || Stauffer (2–1) || Manship (0–2) || Street (23) || 30,366 || 54–65 || Box
|-  style="text-align:center; bgcolor="ffbbbb"
| 120 || August 14 || @ Rockies || 2–4 || de la Rosa (12–6) || Cashner (8–7) || Brothers (11) || 30,099 || 54–66 || Box
|-  style="text-align:center; bgcolor="ffbbbb"
| 121 || August 15 || Mets || 1–4 || Atchison (3–1) || Gregerson (5–7) || Germen (1) || 21,812 || 54–67 || Box
|-  style="text-align:center; bgcolor="ffbbbb"
| 122 || August 16 || Mets || 2–5 || Niese (5–6) || Kennedy (4–9) || Hawkins (4) || 25,604 || 54–68 || Box
|-  style="text-align:center; bgcolor="bbffbb"
| 123 || August 17 || Mets || 8–2 || Vólquez (9–10) || Aardsma (2–2) ||  || 36,974 || 55–68 || Box
|-  style="text-align:center; bgcolor="bbffbb"
| 124 || August 18 || Mets || 4–3 || Street (1–4) || Feliciano (0–2) ||  || 24,704 || 56–68 || Box
|-  style="text-align:center; bgcolor="ffbbbb"
| 125 || August 19 || Pirates  || 1–3 || Liriano (14–5) || Cashner (8–8) || Melancon (8) || 24,850 || 56–69 || Box
|-  style="text-align:center; bgcolor="ffbbbb"
| 126 || August 20 || Pirates || 1–8 || Burnett (6–8) || Ross (3–6) ||  || 21,381 || 56–70 || Box
|-  style="text-align:center; bgcolor="bbffbb"
| 127 || August 21 || Pirates || 2–1 || Kennedy (5–9) || Cole (6–6) || Street (24) || 19,126 || 57–70 || Box
|-  style="text-align:center; bgcolor="bbffbb"
| 128 || August 23 || Cubs || 8–6 || Vincent (3–1) || Russell (1–5) || Street (25) || 23,561 || 58–70 || Box
|-  style="text-align:center; bgcolor="ffbbbb"
| 129 || August 24 || Cubs || 2–3 || Samardzija (8–11) || Stults (8–11) || Gregg (26) || 30,870 || 58–71 || Box
|-  style="text-align:center; bgcolor="bbffbb"
| 130 || August 25 || Cubs || 3–2 (15) || Thayer (2–3) || Rondón (2–1) ||  || 22,762 || 59–71 || Box
|-  style="text-align:center; bgcolor="ffbbbb"
| 131 || August 26 || @ Diamondbacks || 1–6 || McCarthy (3–8) || Ross (3–7) ||  || 16,871 || 59–72 || Box
|-  style="text-align:center; bgcolor="ffbbbb"
| 132 || August 27 || @ Diamondbacks || 9–10 (10) || Bell (5–2) || Thayer (2–4) ||  || 19,807 || 59–73 || Box
|-  style="text-align:center; bgcolor="bbffbb"
| 133 || August 28 || @ Diamondbacks || 5–1 || Erlin (2–2) || Miley (9–9) ||  || 20,578 || 60–73 || Box
|-  style="text-align:center; bgcolor="ffbbbb"
| 134 || August 30 || @ Dodgers || 2–9 || Ryu (13–5) || Stults (8–12) ||  || 51,769 || 60–74 || Box
|-  style="text-align:center; bgcolor="ffbbbb"
| 135 || August 31 || @ Dodgers || 1–2 || Wilson (1–0) || Vincent (3–2) || Jansen (23) || 53,121 || 60–75 || Box
|-

|-  style="text-align:center; bgcolor="ffbbbb"
| 136 || September 1 || @ Dodgers || 1–2 || Greinke (14–3) || Thayer (2–5) || Jansen (24) || 52,168 || 60–76 || Box
|-  style="text-align:center; bgcolor="bbffbb"
| 137 || September 2 || Giants || 4–1 || Kennedy (6–9) || Zito (4–11) || Street (26) || 25,430 || 61–76 ||Box
|-  style="text-align:center; bgcolor="bbffbb"
| 138 || September 3 || Giants || 3–2 || Stauffer (3–1) || Dunning (0–2) || Street (27) || 19,889 || 62–76 ||Box
|-  style="text-align:center; bgcolor="ffbbbb"
| 139 || September 4 || Giants || 5–13 || Lincecum (9–13) || Stults (8–13) ||  || 15,762 || 62–77 || Box
|-  style="text-align:center; bgcolor="bbffbb"
| 140 || September 6 || Rockies || 4–3 || Street (2–4) || Brothers (2–1) ||  || 21,476 || 63–77 || Box
|-  style="text-align:center; bgcolor="bbffbb"
| 141 || September 7 || Rockies || 2–1 || Gregerson (6–7) || Belisle (5–6) || Street (28) || 25,272 || 64–77 || Box
|-  style="text-align:center; bgcolor="bbffbb"
| 142 || September 8 || Rockies || 5–2 || Vincent (4–2) || Oswalt (0–5) || Street (29) || 18,656 || 65–77 || Box
|-  style="text-align:center; bgcolor="bbffbb"
| 143 || September 10 || @ Phillies || 8–2 || Cashner (9–8) || Cloyd (2–4) ||  || 29,242 || 66–77 || Box
|-  style="text-align:center; bgcolor="ffbbbb"
| 144 || September 11 || @ Phillies || 2–4 || Lee (13–6) || Vincent (4–3) || Papelbon (26) || 30,351 || 66–78 || Box
|-  style="text-align:center; bgcolor="ffbbbb"
| 145 || September 12 || @ Phillies || 5–10 || De Fratus (3–3) || Ross (3–8) ||  || 29,986 || 66–79 || Box
|-  style="text-align:center; bgcolor="bbffbb"
| 146 || September 13 || @ Braves || 4–3 || Vincent (5–3) || Walden (4–3) || Street (30) || 34,112 || 67–79 || Box
|-  style="text-align:center; bgcolor="ffbbbb"
| 147 || September 14 || @ Braves || 1–2 || Medlen (14–12) || Erlin (2–3) || Kimbrel (47) || 40,153 || 67–80 || Box
|-  style="text-align:center; bgcolor="bbffbb"
| 148 || September 15 || @ Braves || 4–0 || Smith (1–1) || Teherán (12–8) ||  || 36,125 || 68–80 || Box
|-  style="text-align:center; bgcolor="bbffbb"
| 149 || September 16 || @ Pirates || 2–0 || Cashner (10–8) || Burnett (8–11) ||  || 20,633 || 69–80 || Box
|-  style="text-align:center; bgcolor="bbffbb"
| 150 || September 17 || @ Pirates || 5–2 || Stults (9–13) || Jeff Locke (10–6) || Gregerson (4) || 22,520 || 70–80 || Box
|-  style="text-align:center; bgcolor="bbffbb"
| 151 || September 18 || @ Pirates || 3–2 || Thayer (3–5) || Melancon (2–2) || Street (31) || 27,640 || 71–80 || Box
|-  style="text-align:center; bgcolor="ffbbbb"
| 152 || September 19 || @ Pirates || 1–10 || Cole (9–7) || Kennedy (6–10) ||  || 26,242 || 71–81 || Box
|-  style="text-align:center; bgcolor="bbffbb"
| 153 || September 20 || Dodgers || 2–0 || Erlin (3–3) || Vólquez (9–12) || Street (32) || 34,986 || 72–81 || Box
|-  style="text-align:center; bgcolor="ffbbbb"
| 154 || September 21 || Dodgers || 0–4 || Kershaw (15–9) || Smith (1–2) ||  || 40,572 || 72–82 || Box
|-  style="text-align:center; bgcolor="ffbbbb"
| 155 || September 22 || Dodgers || 0–1 || Howell (4–1) || Cashner (10–9) || Jansen (27) || 32,988 || 72–83 || Box
|-  style="text-align:center; bgcolor="bbffbb"
| 156 || September 23 || Diamondbacks || 4–1 || Stults (10–13) || McCarthy (5–10) || Street (33) || 15,869 || 73–83 || Box
|-  style="text-align:center; bgcolor="ffbbbb"
| 157 || September 24 || Diamondbacks || 1–2 (12) || Collmenter (5–4) || Gregerson (6–8) || Ziegler (12) || 18,562 || 73–84 || Box
|-  style="text-align:center; bgcolor="bbffbb"
| 158 || September 25 || Diamondbacks || 12–2 || Kennedy (7–10) || Delgado (5–7) ||  || 29,528 || 74–84 || Box
|-  style="text-align:center; bgcolor="bbffbb"
| 159 || September 26 || Diamondbacks || 3–2 (11) || Vincent (6–3) || Collmenter (5–5) ||  || 21,393 || 75–84 || Box
|-  style="text-align:center; bgcolor="ffbbbb"
| 160 || September 27 || @ Giants || 3–7 || Vogelsong (4–6) || Smith (1–3) ||  || 41,103 || 75–85 || Box
|-  style="text-align:center; bgcolor="bbffbb"
| 161 || September 28 || @ Giants || 9–3 || Stults (11–13) || Petit (4–1) ||  || 41,201 || 76–85 || Box
|-  style="text-align:center; bgcolor="ffbbbb"
| 162 || September 29 || @ Giants || 6–7 || Romo (5–8) || Street (2–5) ||  || 41,495 || 76–86 || Box
|-

Roster

Farm system 

LEAGUE CHAMPIONS: San Antonio

References

External links
San Diego Padres official site
2013 San Diego Padres at Baseball-Reference.com

San Diego Padres seasons
San Diego Padres
San Diego